Extermination or exterminate may refer to:

 Pest control, elimination of insects or vermin
 Genocide, extermination—in whole or in part—of an ethnic, racial, religious, or national group
 Homicide or murder in general
 "Exterminate!", the battle cry of the Daleks in the British television show Doctor Who
 As a proper noun
 Extermination (comics), a Marvel Comics crossover event featuring the X-Men
 Extermination (video game), a 2001 PlayStation 2 game by Deep Space
 ExtermiNation, a 2015 album by heavy metal band Raven
 "Exterminate!" (song), a 1992 song by Snap!

See also 
 Kill (disambiguation)
 Extinction
 Extermination camps
 Exterminator (disambiguation)
 Termination (disambiguation)